Veronica Lucy Gordon is a South Sudanese journalist, radio broadcaster and rights activist who is the co-founder of the Association of Media Women in South Sudan (AMWISS). In 2014, she became the first female executive board member of the Association for Media Development of South Sudan (AMDISS).

Background and education 
Gordon has a Diploma in Community Studies and Rural Development which she obtained from Juba University. She also underwent a six month training on reporting for  newspapers and photography and this was sponsored by Hirondele and the BBC Trust.

Career 
Gordon was a newspaper columnist with the Nile Mirror Newspaper in 1983 and mainly reported on girl’s education.

Between 1985 and 2000, Gordon worked at the Sudan National Broadcasting Cooperation from which she was forcefully retired. She then joined the Coordination Council for the Southern States, which had been founded by Riek Machar. In 2006, she was working as a producer and translator of programs for Free Voice radio.

In 2006, alongside the late Apollonia Mathia and others, Gordon co-founded the Association of Media Women in South Sudan (AMWISS) while also acting as a Director at South Sudan Radio (2012).

In 2014, Gordon was elected the first female deputy chairperson of the Association for Media Development in South Sudan (AMDISS).

See also 

 Apollonia Mathia
 Mass media in South Sudan
 Human rights in South Sudan

References 

   

Living people
South Sudanese women journalists
South Sudanese journalists
South Sudanese activists
Year of birth missing (living people)